Coca-Cola Baltimore Branch Factory is a historic factory complex located at Baltimore, Maryland, United States. It was constructed from 1921 to 1948 and built principally to house Coca-Cola's syrup-making operations. The complex is spread over a  site and includes a two-story brick syrup factory/sugar warehouse and an earlier two-story brick mattress factory (The Simmons Building) that Coca-Cola acquired and adapted in the 1930s.  Completed in 1948, the complex housed syrup-making operations as well as the Coca-Cola Company's chemistry department.

Coca-Cola Baltimore Branch Factory was listed on the National Register of Historic Places in 2001.

References

External links
, including photo from 2000, at Maryland Historical Trust

Buildings and structures in Baltimore
Industrial buildings and structures on the National Register of Historic Places in Baltimore
Industrial buildings completed in 1948
Locust Point, Baltimore
Coca-Cola buildings and structures